Christian H. Armbruster (March 14, 1921 – February 24, 1986) was an American lawyer and politician from New York.

Life
He was born on March 14, 1921, in Yonkers, Westchester County, New York. He graduated from Columbia College in 1944, and from Columbia Law School in 1947. He practiced law in Yonkers, and lived in Bronxville. He entered politics as a Republican, and was a member of the Board of Supervisors of Westchester County from 1949 to 1958.

He was a member of the New York State Assembly (Westchester Co., 1st D.) from 1959 to 1964, sitting in the 172nd, 173rd and 174th New York State Legislatures. In November 1964, he ran for re-election, but was defeated by Democrat Thomas J. McInerney.

Armbruster was a member of the New York State Senate in 1966. He did not run for re-election.

He died on February 24, 1986, in Doctor's Hospital in Manhattan, of a respiratory ailment.

Sources

1921 births
1986 deaths
People from Yonkers, New York
Republican Party New York (state) state senators
Republican Party members of the New York State Assembly
Columbia Law School alumni
County legislators in New York (state)
20th-century American politicians
Columbia College (New York) alumni